"Stop Dragon My Heart Around" is the seventh episode of the American superhero television series Peacemaker, a spin-off from the 2021 film The Suicide Squad. The episode was written by series creator James Gunn and directed by Brad Anderson. It originally aired on HBO Max on February 10, 2022.

The series is set after the events of The Suicide Squad, and follows Christopher Smith / Peacemaker. Smith returns to his home but is forced to work with A.R.G.U.S. agents on a classified operation only known as "Project Butterfly". Smith also has to deal with his personal demons, including feeling haunted by memories of people he killed for "peace", as well as reconnecting with his estranged father. In the episode, the team is separated and subsequently chased by many personal enemies, which ends with some deaths.

The episode received extremely positive reviews from critics, who praised the writing, directing, performances, emotional tone and set-up for the finale.

Plot
The episode starts with a young Smith bonding with his brother Keith, before his father forces them to fight for the entertainment of his followers. After being mocked by Auggie, Smith accidentally kills his brother, an event that still haunts him in present day.

Having discovered that Adebayo was responsible for planting the fake diary, Smith sets out with Chase to kill the "cow" that supplies the Butterflies with the amber fluid. As Economos tries to make sense of the situation, he reluctantly joins them. Meanwhile, Harcourt confronts Adebayo for planting the diary, and learns that Waller is her mother.

As Smith, Chase and Economos drive to find the "cow", their car is rammed by Auggie, wearing the White Dragon suit. As Smith and Economos flee into the woods, Chase detonates a grenade that slightly damages Auggie's suit before hiding as well. As Murn tries to mend things between Harcourt and Adebayo, their meeting is interrupted when the police arrive at their motel. As Harcourt and Adebayo hide in the hallways, Murn sacrifices himself by killing some of the officers before he is killed by Song, who also kills Murn's Butterfly. Harcourt and Adebayo comfort the Murn Butterfly before it dies. Judomaster, who had escaped the headquarters, arrives and attacks them, but is once again beaten and incapacitated.

After losing Auggie and his followers, Smith and Economos meet with Chase and flee in a car. However, they realize that Chase also took a bag of helmets, all of which are equipped with a GPS tracking unit. Smith tries to dispose of them but is sighted by Auggie's followers. Auggie arrives, critically wounds Eagly and brutally attacks Smith, intending to kill him. Chase then jumps onto him and disables his suit functions, while Economos guns down Auggie's followers. Smith beats Auggie and confronts him for forcing him to kill his brother, but hesitates in killing him. Auggie mocks him, so Smith shoots him dead.

Smith, Chase and Economos meet with Harcourt and Adebayo at a veterinary clinic. Adebayo finds Smith praying for Eagly's health, who suddenly wakes up in front of Smith. With Murn dead, they appoint Harcourt as the new leader, who declares that they need to stop the Butterflies from teleporting the "cow", with their main mission being killing it. The team then sets out to go to the farm where the "cow" is kept. While driving, Adebayo tries to apologize to Smith, but he dismisses her. He also claims that when the mission is over, he doesn't want to see her ever again. At the farm, Song and the Butterflies tend to the "cow", revealed to be a massive multi-eyed insect.

Production

Development
In July 2021, it was announced that Brad Anderson would direct an episode of the series.

Writing
The episode featured the death of Clemson Murn. As Murn's death scene was shot out of order in the episode, Chukwudi Iwuji didn't approach the scene as his last scene, explaining "When we were doing it, it sort of choked out of me, which is always fun as an actor. You always want to be surprised by yourself and by what happens."

Jennifer Holland commented on the role that Harcourt would play for the episode, "I don't know that Emilia feels yet like she's a team leader, but she's definitely in a place now where she's been stepping up and becoming a more integral part of the team. She's also been accepting the fact that she's not a lone wolf, that she has a team and that’s better than working alone, because I think that for the longest time she just thought, 'Oh my God, these people are slowing me down'. But throughout the course of the series so far, she has really embraced being a part of a team — and she likes it."

Reception

Critical reviews
"Stop Dragon My Heart Around" received extremely positive reviews from critics. Samantha Nelson of IGN gave the episode a "great" 8 out of 10 rating and wrote in his verdict, "Peacemaker finally confronts his father in a dramatic, prolonged battle that mixes zany comedy and big emotional stakes. Episode 7 shows how the characters have grown individually and as a team, developing into a group that just might be capable of saving the world."

Jarrod Jones of The A.V. Club gave the episode an "A" grade and wrote, "'Stop Dragon My Heart' is an all-business episode that racks up a dramatic body count, the bleakest installment of Peacemaker yet, but it is not without a touch of sweetness. There's the moment where we find Peacemaker praying over Eagly, who lunged at the White Dragon and paid a price for it, the only one besides Keith who ever loved Chris for real." Alec Bojalad of Den of Geek gave the episode a 4 star rating out of 5 and wrote, "'Stop Dragon My Heart Around' is a little strange as far as penultimate episodes go. Part of it is spent wrapping up Chris Smith's struggles with his father in spectacular fashion while the other part deals with setting up the climactic battle against the Butterflies in the finale to come. As such, the episode is a bit tonally confused and relegates what should be a series highlight to a miniboss battle on the way to the big one. Still, that miniboss battle is so thrilling and so rich that this ultimately feels like 40 minutes (the show's shortest episode runtime yet) well spent."

Accolades
TVLine named John Cena as an honorable mention as the "Performer of the Week" for the week of February 12, 2022, for his performance in the episode. The site wrote, "When Peacemaker was announced to be the focus of his own HBO Max series, few looked forward to spending more time with the foul-mouthed killer of The Suicide Squads [Spoiler]. And yet here we are, enjoying every weekly installment — in large part due to John Cena's all-in, winning performance in the title role. Throughout the season, we've been nudged to feel bad for Chris Smith, or at least sympathize with the son of a white supremacist. But in this week's penultimate hour, Cena dove into his most powerful moments, as Chris — in the midst being whaled upon by the White Dragon, and in the wake of remembering the circumstances of his brother's death — found himself with no option but to pummel his pop in return and, ultimately, kill him. Add in a sweet vigil at Eagly's hospital bedside, followed by his joy at his sidekick's revival, and what can we say? Cena rocks."

References

External links
 

Peacemaker (TV series) episodes
2022 American television episodes
Television episodes written by James Gunn